Leucine-rich repeat neuronal protein 1 is a protein that in humans is encoded by the LRRN1 gene.

References

Further reading